Nikki Taylor may refer to:

Nikki M. Taylor (born circa 1972), American historian 
Niki Taylor (born 1975), American model